Symmimetis heveli is a moth in the family Geometridae. It is found on Borneo and possibly Peninsular Malaysia.

The length of the forewings is about 10 mm.

References

Moths described in 1997
Eupitheciini